Kőbányai Barátság was a Hungarian football club from the town of Kőbánya, Budapest, Hungary.

History
Kőbányai Barátság debuted in the 1945–46 season of the Hungarian League and finished nineteenth.

Name Changes 
?-1947: Kőbányai Barátság
1946: merger with Kőbányai MTE
1947: merger with Szentlőrinci AC Barátság

References

External links
 Profile

Football clubs in Hungary
Defunct football clubs in Hungary
1947 disestablishments in Hungary
Association football clubs disestablished in 1947
Kőbánya